Heeze is a railway station in Heeze, Netherlands. The station opened on 1 May 1977 and is on the Eindhoven–Weert railway. The services are operated by Nederlandse Spoorwegen. The first station was 1 km away from its current location and was called Heeze-Leende. This station opened on 1 November 1913 and closed on 1 May 1977, although was closed for 2 months in 1945.

Train service
The following services calls at Heeze:
2x per hour local services (sprinter) Eindhoven - Weert

External links
NS website 
Dutch Public Transport journey planner 

Railway stations in North Brabant
Railway stations opened in 1977
Heeze-Leende